Boniface Hie Toh (born 6 September 1936) is an Ivorian boxer. He competed in the men's welterweight event at the 1964 Summer Olympics. At the 1964 Summer Olympics, he lost to Hans-Erik Pedersen of Denmark.

References

1936 births
Living people
Ivorian male boxers
Olympic boxers of Ivory Coast
Boxers at the 1964 Summer Olympics
Place of birth missing (living people)
Welterweight boxers